The Venceremos Brigade is an international organization founded in 1969 by members of the Students for a Democratic Society (SDS) and officials of the Republic of Cuba.  It was formed as a coalition of young people to show solidarity with the Cuban Revolution by working side by side with Cuban workers, challenging U.S. policies towards Cuba, including the United States embargo against Cuba. The yearly brigade trips, which as of 2010 have brought more than 9,000 people to Cuba, continue today and are coordinated with the Pastors For Peace Friendship Caravans to Cuba. The 48th Brigade travelled to Cuba in July 2017.

History

Original brigades

The 1959 Cuban Revolution was a key event that galvanized and inspired the growing New Left in the 1960s. Cuba became viewed as a radical and anti-imperialist third world country worthy of praise by many of the radical activists of the 1960s.

In 1969, SDS was composed of competing factions with individual priorities and visions. SDS delegates travelled to Havana, and were inspired by Fidel Castro's New Year's Day speech, in which he called on Cubans to help with the sugar harvest. Although the Americans originally offered to help by taking industrial jobs displaced by the massive sugar harvest, Fidel reportedly responded that if North Americans were to help, they would cut cane. Hoping to unite SDS members behind a new project, the leaders began planning a trip, bringing American activists to Cuba to cut sugar cane. Carl Oglesby originally presented the idea to members of SDS, but was ousted from SDS before it came to fruition. Bernardine Dohrn appointed Julie Nichamin and Brian Murphy to organize the trip. Allen Young was also partly responsible for the organization and negotiations with Carlos Rafael Rodríguez and other members of the Cuban government. While in the US, the group met occasionally by regions to supervise, recruit, and fundraise for the trips. The trip cohort, the Venceremos ("we shall triumph" in Spanish language) Brigade, was promoted as an inspiring and educational experience. The brigade itself was designed to encompass members from all radical movements in the United States, from black power radicals to anti-war student activists.

In November 1969, the first brigade of 216 Americans travelled to Cuba from Mexico City to skirt the U.S. government's restrictions on travel to the island. The participants were to contribute to Cuba's monumental ten million ton zafra (harvest) of 1970, as well as to commemorate the tenth anniversary of the Cuban Revolution. The second Brigade arrived in February 1970, to cut cane and learn about Cuban life. Although the zafra did not reach ten million tons, the Brigades continued.

Later developments
The Antonio Maceo Brigade was formed as a Cuban solidarity group of Cuban American radicals that first traveled to Cuba in 1977. Many Cubans who joined the brigade were motivated to prove that they weren't counterrevolutionary "gusanos". At the time the Venceremos Brigade refused to allow Cuban exiles to be members believing them all to be middle class and counterrevolutionary "gusanos".

The FBI has questioned individual brigade travellers over the years. Michael Ratner, who had represented members of the Venceremos Brigade, said that visits by FBI agents were most prevalent in the 1970s and 1980s and dropped off during the 1990s. In 2010, at least 10 brigade participants were visited by FBI agents.

Organization

Ideology 
In Venceremos Brigade, Sandra Levinson and Carol Brightman describe the participants, brigadistas, as "American radicals." They were attracted to Cuba by the socialist revolution taking place, the anti-imperialist movement, as well as Cuban culture. The Venceremos Brigade included a diverse group of participants from the beginning. White, Black, Chicano, Native American, and Puerto Rican Americans, as well as activists and feminists participated. In part, the Venceremos Brigade went to Cuba to study revolutionary culture, Che Guevara, and Che's new socialist man. New Left philosophy permeated the movement. The brigadistas also invoked Cuba's history of anti-racist and anti-colonial movements, and referred to the Black Power and feminist movements in the US, with the goal of creating a revolutionary political culture within the group.

Despite the leftist nature of the Brigades and the Cuban government, conflict emerged between Brigade organizers and gay members of the Brigade and their allies. To Cuban officials, the gay liberation movement represented American imperialism, and was a challenge to Fidel Castro and Cuba. The organizers of the Venceremos Brigades settled on a Don't ask, don't tell policy, requiring queer brigadistas to refrain from discussing or performing their sexuality. Queer brigadistas were subject to homophobic slurs and questions, and homophobia was the overall policy. There were also race and gender-based tensions in the early brigades.

Notable brigadistas
Karen Bass, member of the US House of Representatives
 Carol Brightman, counter-cultural author.
 Linda Burnham, communist political organizer.
Leslie Cagan, socialist peace activist and radio executive
Johnnetta Cole, college president and museum executive
Roxanne Dunbar-Ortiz, historian and academic
Tibor Kalman, graphic designer
Michael Kazin, historian, professor and co-editor of Dissent magazine.
Jeffrey Bruce Klein, founder of Mother Jones magazine.
Antonio Villaraigosa, former mayor of Los Angeles
Allen Young, counter-cultural activist and later critic of the Cuban government.

 See also 
 Antonio Maceo Brigade

Further reading
Venceremos Brigade research collection, DePaul University Special Collections and Archives
Oglesby, Carl. Ravens in the Storm, Scribner, New York, 2008. pp. 223-
Cuban Journal : A Poet in the Venceremos Brigade. 1970. 
Sandy Lillydahl Venceremos Brigade Photograph Collection
"Cuba, Que Linda Es Cuba? The First Venceremos Brigade". Dissent Magazine. Retrieved 2017-06-13.
Cluster, Dick. "The Venceremos Brigade," The Sixties'', Harvard Review of Latin America.

References

External links
Venceremos Brigade
Pastors For Peace Cuba Friendship Caravan
Young Lords
Brigade who Defied Cuba Travel Ban Return to US July 26, 2010
Rick Rice Papers. circa 1960–1999. 2.44 cubic feet (2 cartons, 1 box).

Political organizations based in the United States
Cuba–United States relations
DePaul University Special Collections and Archives holdings
Cuba solidarity groups
Organizations established in 1969
1969 establishments in the United States